Gheorghe Șincai (February 28, 1754 – November 2, 1816) was a Romanian historian, philologist, translator, poet, and representative of the Enlightenment-influenced Transylvanian School.

As the director of Greek Catholic education in Transylvania he brought a fundamental contribution to the process of promoting culture in rural environments. He revised before publishing Samuil Micu's first grammar of the Romanian language: Elementa linguae daco-romanae sive valachicae (The elements of the Daco-Roman or Vlach/Wallachian language) (Vienna, 1780), in which they demonstrated the Latin origins of the Romanian language.

Biography 
Born in Mezősámsond, (now Râciu de Câmpie, Mureș County, Romania), he studied at Marosvásárhely, Kolozsvár, Beszterce, Balázsfalva, Vienna and Rome (in the last two cities together with Samuil Micu, nephew of Bishop Inocențiu Micu-Klein).

He turned out to be a polyglot, thoroughly mastering Greek, Latin, Hungarian, German, Italian and French. His knowledge and culture allowed him to occupy the function of librarian of the Congregation for the Evangelization of Peoples in Rome, having permission to research any type of document. In the Papal States, and later in Hungary and in Vienna (the capital of the Habsburg domains), he carried out research work in various libraries, copying and transcribing exactly any reference to the history of the Romanians.

Șincai assiduously worked to educate commoners, dedicating himself to a career in teaching, and contributing to the establishment of an impressive number of Greek-Catholic parochial schools (in all, over 300). In 1784 he was named general director of Romanian Uniate schools in all of Transylvania.

He translated and expanded the following basic textbooks for educational purposes: Abecedarul (The Book of ABCs), Gramatica (Grammar), Aritmetica (Arithmetic) and Catehismul (The Catechism), adapting or creating the terminology necessary for pupils to understand these. He proved himself to be a remarkable translator, rendering the Bible into Romanian (in 1789, under the name of The Blaj Bible).

In 1794 Șincai came into direct conflict with Bishop Ioan Bob; he was thrown into the harsh prison of Aiud, being followed and persecuted by the Habsburg authorities after his release in 1796.

In 1811 Șincai published a work of history, written in the form of annals and amply titled: Hronica românilor și a mai multor neamuri în cât au fost ele amestecate cu românii, cât lucrurile, întâmplările și faptele unora față de ale altora nu se pot scrie pre înțeles, din mai multe mii de autori, în cursul a treizeci și patru de ani culese (The chronicle of the Romanians and of other peoples insofar as they were mixed with the Romanians, as the things, events and facts of the one regarding the other cannot be written as if everyone understands them, from several thousand authors, gathered over the course of thirty-four years).

Șincai died at Szinye, near Kassa (today Košice in present-day Slovakia).

Bibliography 

 Dionis Popa, Gheorghe Șincai, Blaj, 1944

References 

19th-century Romanian historians
Romanian male poets
Romanian Greek-Catholics
Catholic poets
Romanian schoolteachers
Transylvanian School
Age of Enlightenment
Romanian people in the Principality of Transylvania (1711–1867)
Romanian Austro-Hungarians
People from Mureș County
1754 births
1816 deaths
Linguists from Romania
18th-century linguists
Linguists of Indo-European languages
Romanian translators
18th-century male writers
18th-century translators
Eastern Catholic poets